Enlightenment or enlighten may refer to:

Age of Enlightenment
 Age of Enlightenment, period in Western intellectual history from the late 17th to late 18th century, centered in France but also encompassing (alphabetically by country or culture):
 England: Midlands Enlightenment, period in 18th-century England
 Greece: Modern Greek Enlightenment, an 18th-century national revival and educational movement in Greece
 Italy: Italian Enlightenment, period in 18th-century Italy
 Jewish: Haskalah, Jewish Enlightenment, movement among European Jews in the late 18th century
 Poland: Enlightenment in Poland, ideas of the Age of Enlightenment in Poland
 Russia: Russian Enlightenment, 18th-century period of active government encouragement of proliferation of arts and sciences in Russia
 Scotland: Scottish Enlightenment, period in 18th-century Scotland
 Spain: Enlightenment in Spain, came to Spain with a new dynasty, the Bourbons, subsequent reform and 'enlightened despotism'
 USA: American Enlightenment, intellectual culture of the British North American colonies and the early United States

Computing
Enlightenment (software), an X Window System window manager
Enlighten (radiosity engine), code to do real-time calculation of indirect lighting ("radiosity") in video
Enlightenment Foundation Libraries, a set of graphics libraries

Culture

Overview
 Enlightenment in Buddhism, translation of the term bodhi "awakening"
 Enlightenment (spiritual), insight or awakening to the true nature of reality
 Ionian Enlightenment, the origin of ancient Greek advances in philosophy and science

Events
 Enlighten Canberra, an annual arts and cultural festival in Canberra, Australia
 "Enlightenment", the main artistic performance in the 2012 Summer Paralympics opening ceremony

Film and television
Enlightenment (Doctor Who), a 1983 Doctor Who serial

Music
Enlightenment (Van Morrison album), 1990
Enlightenment (McCoy Tyner album), 1973
"Enlightenment" (Van Morrison song), 1990
Enlightenment (soundtrack album), the soundtrack of the 2012 Summer Paralympics opening ceremony

Other uses
Enlightenment Intensive, a group retreat designed to enable a spiritual enlightenment
Enlightenment Movement (Afghanistan), a Hazara grassroots civil disobedience group created in Afghanistan in 2016
Project Enlightenment, an educational program

See also
 Counter-Enlightenment, a term used by some 20th century commentators to describe contemporary reasoned opposition to the Age of Enlightenment
 Dark Enlightenment, an anti-democratic and reactionary movement that broadly rejects egalitarianism and Whig historiography

Enlightened (disambiguation)